Nyagak Power Station is a  mini hydroelectric power plant in Uganda.

Location
The power station is located across the Nyagak River, in Nyapea Sub-county, Okoro County, Zombo District, in West Nile sub-region, Northern Region. This location is in the town of Paidha, close to the border with the Democratic Republic of the Congo. The coordinates of the power station are 2°25'50.0"N 30°57'50.0"E (Latitude: 2.430556; Longitude: 30.963889).

Overview
The site and the development concept for the project have been extensively studied, including:

 an environmental impact analysis (EIA) by Gissat Technical Consultants Limited in 1997
 a detailed feasibility study and EIA by Harza Engineering in 1998
 an EIA by NORPLAN in 2001
 an Environmental Impact Statement by Environmental Management Associates and the ECON Center for Economic Analysis in 2005.

The Nyagak hydropower project, in its first phase, is expected to generate 3.5 megawatts, using a run-of-river scheme. A power intake will be located at the left abutment of the weir. The powerhouse will be configured to accommodate two  generating units along with the associated electro-mechanical equipment. The sub-region is not connected to the national electric grid and is not expected to be connected to the grid until the planned  Karuma Power Station comes online in 2018.

It is anticipated that power produced from Nyagak will serve a population exceeding one million people in Arua District, Nebbi District, and Zombo District. A 33 kilovolt powerline connecting the towns of Arua and Nebbi is being developed. A 33 kilovolt powerline already exists between the towns of Nebbi and Paidha and is just a short distance away from the proposed powerhouse.

All the studies carried out before construction of the powerhouse indicated that potentially low environmental and social impacts would result from the implementation of the Nyagak Hydropower Project. The main reason for this is that the hydro scheme is small and its impact is limited. The area is sparsely populated with low aquatic and terrestrial ecological characteristics.

The Nyagak Hydropower project is in line with the Ugandan government’s plans for the decentralization and privatization of hydropower systems. The government of Uganda, through support from the World Bank, is in the process of implementing the Energy for Rural Transformation (ERT) through the African Rural Renewable Energy Initiative (AFRREI). West Nile Rural Electrification Company (WENRECO), a subsidiary of Industrial Promotion Services, was selected to develop the power plant. Construction began in December 2006.

Construction delays
The project was delayed for nearly two decades because of financial and procurement hurdles at the government level.

President Yoweri Museveni broke ground in February 2006. In December 2006, the Czech construction firm Skodaexport Company Limited started construction. Since 2006, about ten deadlines were issued for completion of the dam.

After multiple interruptions, construction of the power station resumed in August 2010. Spencon Services of India was selected as the new contractor. Under the revised terms of the contract, the government of Uganda took a 10 percent shareholding in the power station.

By July 2012, the construction of the power station was complete. On 14 September 2012, President Yoweri Museveni commissioned the power plant.

Construction costs
The estimated costs for the dam and power plant were approximately US$14 million.

The German Investment Corporation, a subsidiary of KfW, has provided US$11 million for construction of the power station, as well as US$13 million for the West Nile Electric Grid Extension and Rehabilitation Project.

Photos and diagrams
  Nyagak Dam Construction Site In April 2012

See also

List of power stations in Uganda
List of hydropower stations in Africa
List of hydroelectric power stations

References

External links
  West Nile Grid Extension On Schedule 
 Nyagak II Power Station Under Construction
 Nyagak Power Station Expected Ready In 2010
 Nyagak Power Station Ready In December 2011
 New Completion Date Is December 2011
 Commissioning Pushed Back To January 2012
 Development Timeline of Nyagak Power Station
 Development Implications of Nyagak Power Station

Energy infrastructure completed in 2012
Dams completed in 2012
Hydroelectric power stations in Uganda
Zombo District